The 2020–21 FC Vaduz season was the club's 89th season in their existence and the first season since their return to the top flight of Swiss football after their promotion from the 2019–20 Swiss Challenge League. In addition to the 2020–21 Swiss Super League, Vaduz will participate in the 2020–21 Liechtenstein Cup. Teams from Liechtenstein are not allowed to enter the Swiss Cup, they play in the Liechtenstein Football Cup. The season covered the period from 19 September 2020 to 30 June 2021.

Players

First-team squad

Transfers

In

Out

Pre-season and friendlies

Competitions

Overview

Swiss Super League

On Monday 31 August 2020 the Swiss Football League (SFL) published the schedule for the Raiffeisen Super League 2020–21. FCV start the new season on Sunday 20 September with an away game against Basel in St. Jakob-Park. In a first step, the SFL published the schedule for the first 18 rounds, but only fixed the times for the first nine rounds. The final schedule with all games will follow by the end of the year.

League table

Results summary

Results by round

Matches
On Monday 31 August 2020 the Swiss Football League (SFL) published the schedule for the Raiffeisen Super League 2020–21. In a first step, the SFL published the schedule for the first 18 rounds, but only fixed times for the first nine rounds. The final schedule with all games for all 36 rounds followed at the end of the year.

Second half of season

Liechtenstein Cup

UEFA Europa League

Statistics

Goalscorers

References

External links

FC Vaduz seasons
Vaduz